Ralph Plumb (March 29, 1816 – April 8, 1903) was a U.S. Representative from Illinois.

Biography
Ralph Plumb was born in Busti, New York on March 29, 1816. He attended the common schools. He engaged in mercantile pursuits, and moved to Ohio. He served as member of the Ohio State house of representatives in 1855. Deciding to study law, he was admitted to the bar in 1857 and commenced practice in Oberlin, Ohio. During the Civil War served in the Union Army as captain and quartermaster of Volunteers, 1861-65. He was brevetted lieutenant colonel.

He moved to Illinois in 1866 and settled in Streator. He engaged in the mining of coal and the building of railroads. He served as mayor of Streator from 1882–85, and was later elected as a Republican to the Forty-ninth and Fiftieth Congresses (March 4, 1885 – March 3, 1889). Plumb engaged in banking until his death in Streator on April 8, 1903.

References

Further reading
 

1816 births
1903 deaths
People from Busti, New York
People from Streator, Illinois
Union Army officers
Mayors of places in Illinois
Republican Party members of the United States House of Representatives from Illinois
19th-century American politicians
Military personnel from Illinois